Meller is a surname. Notable people with the surname include:

Amos Meller (1938–2007), Israeli composer and conductor
David Meller (born 1959), British businessman
Edward Meller (c. 1647 – 1699), English politician
Nina Genke-Meller (1893–1954), Ukrainian-Russian avant-garde artist, designer, graphic artist and scenographer
Richard James Meller (1872–1940), British barrister and Conservative politician
Stefan Meller (1942–2008), Polish diplomat and academician
Vadym Meller (1884–1962), Ukrainian-Russian Soviet painter, avant-garde artist, theatrical designer, book illustrator and architect
Walter Meller (1819–1886), British Conservative MP for Stafford

See also
Meller's duck (Anas melleri), a dabbling duck 
Meller's mongoose (Rhynchogale melleri), a mongoose
Melodrama, which in theater slang is referred to as meller